Richard van Zijtveld (born 6 August 1979) is a former Dutch darts player who played in Professional Darts Corporation (PDC) events.

Career
He started playing in PDC events in 2007. His first event was the Thialf Darts Trophy 2007, where he lost 3–0 in sets (0–2, 1–2 and 0–2) to Ronnie Baxter. In 2009, Van Zijtveld became a member of the PDC. In that year he played eight Players Championships, reaching the second round once. He also played in the German Darts Championship, losing 6–1 to Mark Dudbridge in the second round.
In 2013 he played in Qualifying School and became an Associate Member of the PDC again, after failing to win a main tour card. He qualified for one event on the European Tour, the German Darts Championship where he was beaten 6–3 by Michael Hurtz in the first round.
In 2014, Van Zijtveld was beaten in the third round of the opening UK Open Qualifier of the year by Peter Wright and could not advance beyond this stage in any of the tournaments he entered in the rest of the year.

References

External links

1979 births
Living people
Dutch darts players
People from Soest, Netherlands
Professional Darts Corporation associate players
Sportspeople from Utrecht (province)
21st-century Dutch people